The 1995–96 Penn State Nittany Lions basketball team represented Pennsylvania State University as a member of the Big Ten Conference during the 1995–96 season. The team was led by long-time assistant Jerry Dunn, serving in his first-year as head coach. Penn State played its home games in University Park, Pennsylvania – the first six at Rec Hall before opening the brand new Bryce Jordan Center on January 11, 1996. After winning the first 13 games of the season, the Nittany Lions climbed as high as No. 9 in the AP poll, and received an at-large bid to the NCAA tournament. Penn State lost to Arkansas in the opening round to finish the season with an overall record of 21–7 (12–6 Big Ten).

Roster

Schedule and results

|-
!colspan=9 style=| Regular Season

|-
!colspan=9 style=| Big Ten Regular Season

|-
!colspan=9 style=| NCAA Tournament

– Source:

Rankings

References 

Penn State Nittany Lions basketball seasons
Penn State
Penn State
1995 in sports in Pennsylvania
1996 in sports in Pennsylvania